The Champion (Italian: Il campione) is a 1943 Italian sports film directed by Carlo Borghesio and starring Enzo Fiermonte, Vera Bergman and Erminio Spalla.

It was shot at the Fert Studios in Turin. The film's sets were designed by the art director Luigi Ricci.

Synopsis
A former boxer, now a trainer, discovers a young fighter who he feels has all the skills to become a champion. He takes him under his wing and begins to shape him into a fully rounded fighter. However the young man's success goes to his head and he becomes involved with a rich, vapid lady without realising that his trainer's daughter is in love with him.

Cast
 Enzo Fiermonte as Massimo 
 Vera Bergman as Wanda Gregorovitch 
 Erminio Spalla as Mario Martini 
 Fiorella Betti as Bianca Martini, sua figlia 
 Michele Riccardini as Federico 
 Alessandra Adari
 Michele Bonaglia
 Mario Bosisio
 Luigi Garrone
 Amedeo Martini
 Bianca Martini
 Merlo Preciso
 Massimo Riccardi
 Vera Ruberti
 Mirella Scriatto
 Beniamino Serpi as Un pugile 
 Vittorio Vaser

References

Bibliography 
 Roberto Chiti & Roberto Poppi. I film: Tutti i film italiani dal 1930 al 1944. Gremese Editore, 2005.

External links 
 
 The Champion at Variety Distribution

1943 films
Italian boxing films
1940s sports films
1940s Italian-language films
Films directed by Carlo Borghesio
Italian black-and-white films
1940s Italian films